Piémontaise was a 40-gun Consolante-class frigate of the French Navy. She served as a commerce raider in the Indian Ocean until her capture in March 1808. She then served with the British Royal Navy in the East Indies until she was broken up in Britain in 1813.

French service
Piémontaise was built by Enterprise Étheart at Saint Malo to a design by François Pastel.

On 18 December 1805 she sailed from Brest for Île de France. There she served as a commerce raider under captain Jacques Epron. On 21 June 1806, she captured the East Indiaman . On 6 September, she captured the 14-gun East India Company brig , the three-masted country ship Atomany, and the East Indiaman .

Between September and October 1807, Piémontaise captured Caroline, Eggleton or Eggleson, master, Sarah, Henderson, master, James, master, Udny, Walteas or Wallis, master, Danneberg or Danesburgh or Castel Dansborg, Winter, master, Highland Chief, Mahapice or Makepiece, master, Eliza, Sparkes, master, and Calcutta. Calcutta was a "native ship". Captain James, of Maria, died aboard Piémontaise on 29 September.

Piémontaise captured  on 9 October 1807. She was carrying toile and 7,500 sacks of rice. The value of the prize was 215,930.24 francs.

In early March 1808, Piémontaise captured three more merchantmen off Southern India.

Capture

On 6 March 1808, Piémontaise encountered . The two ships battled for three days until Piémontaise, out of ammunition and having suffered heavy casualties, had to strike her colours on 8 March. The evening before she struck, Lieutenant de vaisseau Charles Moreau, who had been severely wounded, threw himself into the sea. Captain Hardinge, of St Fiorenzo, was killed in the fighting on the last day. Over the three days the British suffered 13 dead and 25 wounded. The French suffered some 48 dead and 112 wounded.

Lieutenant William Dawson took command and brought both vessels back to Colombo, even though Piémontaise's three masts fell over her side early in the morning of 9 March. Piémontaise had on board British Army officers and captains and officers from prizes that she had taken. These men helped organize the lascars to jury-rig masts and bring Piémontaise into port. St Fiorenzo had too few men, too many casualties, and too many prisoners to guard to provide much assistance. In 1847 the Admiralty awarded the Naval General Service Medal with clasp "San Fiorenzo 8 March 1808" to any surviving claimants from the action.

British service

The British brought Piémontaise into service as HMS Piedmontaise, commissioning her under Captain Charles Foote. The expedition also included .

Foote died in September and Commander Henry D. Dawson replaced him, only to die shortly thereafter. Piedmontaises next captain was T. Epworth, who was replaced in turn by Captain Henry Edgell.

Fate
Piémontaise was taken out of commission at Woolwich on 12 August 1812. She was broken up in January 1813.

Citations and references
Notes

Citations

References
 
 
 
 

Age of Sail frigates of France
1804 ships
Frigates of the French Navy
Frigates of the Royal Navy
Consolante-class frigates